The 2015 Japan Super Series was the seventh Super Series tournament of the 2015 BWF Super Series. The tournament took place in Tokyo, Japan from 8–13 September 2015 with a total prize money of $275,000.
A qualification were held to fill four places in all five disciplines of the main draws.

Men's singles

Seeds

Top half

Bottom half

Finals

Women's singles

Seeds

Top half

Bottom half

Finals

Men's doubles

Seeds

Top half

Bottom half

Finals

Women's doubles

Seeds

Top half

Bottom half

Finals

Mixed doubles

Seeds

Top half

Bottom half

Finals

References 

Japan Open (badminton)
Japan
Super Series
Sports competitions in Tokyo